Justin Douglas O'Conner (born March 31, 1992) is an American professional baseball catcher for the Staten Island FerryHawks of the Atlantic League of Professional Baseball. He was drafted 31st overall in the 2010 Major League Baseball draft by the Tampa Bay Rays.

Career

Tampa Bay Rays
O'Conner attended Cowan High School in Cowan, Indiana. He was drafted by the Tampa Bay Rays in the first round, 31st overall, of the 2010 Major League Baseball Draft. He made his professional debut that season with the Gulf Coast Rays. He played in only 48 games for the rookie-level Princeton Rays in 2011 after suffering a torn hip labrum. He played for the Low-A Hudson Valley Renegades in 2012, batting .223/.276/.370 in 59 games. O'Conner played in 102 games for the Single-A Bowling Green Hot Rods in 2013, slashing .233/.290/.381 with 14 home runs and 56 RBI. After the season, he played in the Australian Baseball League. O'Conner started 2014 with the Charlotte Stone Crabs. He was selected to play in the All-Star Futures Game in July. O'Conner finished the 2014 season with a slash of .278/.316/.466 with 12 home runs and 47 RBI in 101 total games between Charlotte and the Double-A Montgomery Biscuits.

O'Conner was selected to the 40-man roster following the season on November 20, 2014. In 2015, O'Conner returned to Montgomery, playing in 107 games and batting .231/.255/.371 with 9 home runs and 53 RBI. O'Conner missed almost all of the 2016 season due to injury trouble, playing in only 20 total games. On December 12, 2016, O'Conner was designated for assignment by the Rays. He was outrighted to Triple-A on December 16. O'Conner split the 2017 season between Montgomery and the Triple-A Durham Bulls, hitting a cumulative .227/.288/.372 with 8 home runs and 44 RBI in 85 games between the two teams. He elected free agency on November 6, 2017.

San Francisco Giants
On January 25, 2018, O'Conner signed a minor league deal with the San Francisco Giants. He was released on March 26, 2018. After his release from the Giants organization, on April 4, 2018, O'Conner was suspended 50 games after testing positive a second time for a drug of abuse.

St. Paul Saints
On April 16, 2018, O'Conner signed with the St. Paul Saints of the independent American Association. O'Conner played in 82 games for St. Paul in 2018, posting a slash of .250/.292/.459 with 17 home runs and 41 RBI.

Chicago White Sox
On January 22, 2019, O'Conner's contract was purchased by the Chicago White Sox organization. O'Conner had converted to pitching for the 2019 season. O'Conner made 14 appearances for the rookie-level AZL White Sox and Single-A Kannapolis Intimidators, pitching to a 4.50 ERA with 17 strikeouts in 14.0 innings pitched. He elected free agency following the season on November 4.

New York Yankees
On December 14, 2019, O'Conner signed a minor league contract with the New York Yankees organization. O'Conner did not play in a game in 2020 due to the cancellation of the minor league season because of the COVID-19 pandemic. O'Conner did appear for any Yankees affiliate in 2021 due to injury. He elected free agency following the season on November 7, 2021, without having appeared in a game for the Yankees organization.

Staten Island FerryHawks
On June 14, 2022, O'Conner signed with the Staten Island FerryHawks of the Atlantic League of Professional Baseball.

References

External links

1992 births
Living people
Sportspeople from Muncie, Indiana
Baseball players from Indiana
Gulf Coast Rays players
Princeton Rays players
Hudson Valley Renegades players
Bowling Green Hot Rods players
Charlotte Stone Crabs players
Brisbane Bandits players
Peoria Javelinas players
Montgomery Biscuits players
Durham Bulls players
St. Paul Saints players
American expatriate baseball players in Australia